Epermenia insecurella, the chalk-hill lance-wing, is a moth of the  family Epermeniidae. It is found in most of Europe, Asia Minor, the Near East and Mongolia.

The wingspan is 9–11 mm. The moths fly during the day and can be found on the wing in two generations, between May and August

The larvae feed on bastard-toadflax (Thesium humifusum) and Thesium inophyllon. They initially mine the leaves of their host plant. Young larvae make a small, full depth, irregular corridor mine. Older larvae live free on the host plant. Larvae can be found from April to June and again in July. They are yellow with a shining black head.

References

Epermeniidae
Leaf miners
Moths described in 1854
Moths of Asia
Moths of Europe
Taxa named by Henry Tibbats Stainton